The Greater London Council's political leadership was in the hands of a Leader and a number of committees. Detailed policy proposals in the service areas were set by the committees, with the leadership nominating the Chairs who also had a degree of executive responsibility outside of meetings. The Chairs of the Committees also formed an unofficial Cabinet which advised the Leader on policy and through which the Leader could take political soundings.

Formally the committees were divided into Standing Committees and Special Committees. Eventually the cabinet was formed as the 'Leader's Committee' which was a Special Committee.

Fiske administration (1964–1967)

Plummer administration (1967–1973)

Goodwin administration (1973–1977)

Cutler administration (1977–1981)

Livingstone administration (1981–1986)

References
Minutes of the Greater London Council, County Hall, London SE1.

See also
List of heads of London government

 
Chairs